The Blocton Italian Catholic Cemetery is a historic cemetery in West Blocton, Bibb County, Alabama.  It was established in 1896 by an Italian Catholic population, immigrants who worked in the coal mines that were once numerous in the county.  The cemetery is located in what was originally Blocton, a coal mining company town owned by the Tennessee Coal, Iron and Railroad Company.  It was consecrated in 1901 by Edward Patrick Allen, the Roman Catholic Bishop of Mobile.  It continued in use until the 1960s, with the most active use occurring during the 1910s and 1920s.  The cemetery contains approximately 86 funerary monuments.  It was added to the National Register of Historic Places on April 22, 1999.

References

External links
 
 

National Register of Historic Places in Bibb County, Alabama
Cemeteries on the National Register of Historic Places in Alabama
Roman Catholic cemeteries in the United States
1896 establishments in Alabama
Tennessee Coal, Iron and Railroad Company
Cemeteries established in the 1890s